Wang Meng (born 16 March 1993) is a Chinese footballer.

Career statistics

Club
.

References

External links
 

1993 births
Living people
Chinese footballers
Chinese expatriate footballers
Association football defenders
China League One players
China League Two players
U.D. Oliveirense players
Amora F.C. players
Yanbian Funde F.C. players
Shenyang Dongjin F.C. players
Suzhou Dongwu F.C. players
Chinese expatriate sportspeople in Portugal
Expatriate footballers in Portugal